Bartschi or Bärtschi (sometimes also spelled Baertschi) may refer to:
 Arnold Bartschi (1903-1996), who established the Swiss Pines arboretum in  Malvern, Pennsylvania
 Patrik Bärtschi (born 1984), a Swiss professional ice hockey player
 Sven Bärtschi (born 1992), a Swiss ice hockey player
 the American malacologist Paul Bartsch in specific epithets